Old Roman Catholic may refer to:

 Old Catholic Church, all Old Catholics

 Old Roman Catholic Church in Great Britain
 Old Roman Catholic Church of America
 North American Old Roman Catholic Church